Sabal pumos, known as the royal palmetto, is a species of flowering plant in the palm tree family, Arecaceae.

Distribution
The palm tree is endemic to the Balsas dry forests habitats along the Balsas River in central Mexico. It is occasionally grown as an ornamental. 

Mexican states it is native to include:
Guanajuato
Guerrero
Jalisco
State of México
Michoacán
Morelos
Zacatecas

Conservation
Sabal pumos is threatened by habitat loss. It is on the IUCN Vulnerable species list.

See also
Sabal palms and palmettos

References

pumos
Endemic flora of Mexico
Trees of Guerrero
Trees of the State of Mexico
Trees of Michoacán
Trees of Puebla
Trees of Guanajuato
Flora of Morelos
Trees of Zacatecas
Plants described in 1816
Vulnerable plants
Taxonomy articles created by Polbot